Thomas Scott House may refer to:

 Thomas Scott House (Gloster, Louisiana), listed on the NRHP in Louisiana
 Thomas Scott House (Greensboro, North Carolina), listed on the NRHP in North Carolina
 Thomas Scott House (Coatesville, Pennsylvania), listed on the NRHP in Pennsylvania

See also
Scott House (disambiguation)